"Kozmic Blues" is a song from American singer-songwriter Janis Joplin's I Got Dem Ol' Kozmic Blues Again Mama! album, her first after departing Big Brother and the Holding Company. It was a part of Joplin's set at the Woodstock Festival in 1969.

Background
Although the concert as a whole is not regarded as Joplin at her best, that specific performance became very popular and was released on The Essential Janis Joplin.

Chart performance

References 

Janis Joplin songs